Abdelmajid Guemguem (9 March 1947 – 22 January 2021), known professionally as Guem, was an Algerian percussionist.

Biography
Guem lived his youth in Batna. He performed in several musical troupes as a percussionist and was a footballer, playing for CA Batna. He permanently settled in France in the 1970s.

On 14 July 1966, he first took stage at a ball. He then recorded several albums and made international tours, increasing his notoriety. He released his first album, Percussions Africaines in 1973, followed by Guem et Zaka in 1978. At that time, he also composed Le Serpent, re-recorded in 1996 for the program  on France 2. In 2011, he composed Mon Paris, an album with one track dedicated to each arrondissement, and he summed it up by calling it the "most beautiful city in the world".

Guem had a daughter named Sarah, who accompanied him with stage dancing several times. He also gave lessons in percussion and dance at the Centre des arts vivants. His motto as an instructor was "Rhythm is life, and rhythm belongs to everyone. When you have a passion, you have to share it."

Guem died in Paris on 22 January 2021 at the age of 73.

Discography
Percussions Africaines (1973)
Guem & Zaka Percussion (1978)
O Universo Rítmico De Guem (1981)
Félin (1983)
Possession (1985)
Danse (1993)
Musiques de transe (1995)
Baobab (1995)
Voyage (1996)
Rhythm'n'ball (1997)
Percussions (1997)
Royal Dance (1999)
Libertés (2001)
Live à l'Élysée Montmartre (2001)
Rose Des Sables (2003)
De la danse à la transe (2004)
Caméléon (2004)
Couleurs Pays (2007)
Guem [Jérémy Soudant] (2009)
Mon Paris (2011)

References

External links
 
 

Algerian musicians
1947 births
2021 deaths
People from Batna, Algeria
Algerian emigrants to France